Ghislain Maltais (born April 22, 1944) is a Canadian politician. He served in the Senate of Canada from January 6, 2012 to April 22, 2019 as a Conservative representing the Senate division of Shawinegan (Quebec).

Early life and education
He was born in Sacré-Coeur, Quebec and studied at the Université du Québec à Rimouski.

Political career
Maltais was an unsuccessful Liberal candidate in the 1981 Quebec election, but won a by-election on June 20, 1983. He was a member of the Quebec National Assembly representing Saguenay from 1983 until 1994, when he did not run for re-election. He was an unsuccessful Liberal candidate in the 1997 federal election in Charlevoix.

Prior to being appointed to the Senate by Stephen Harper, Maltais was a political organizer for the Conservative Party of Canada. He worked on contract for the Conservative Party from 2006 to 2007, and has been the director of the Conservative Party in Quebec since 2009.

References

External links
 Senate biography
 
 

1944 births
Quebec Liberal Party MNAs
Canadian senators from Quebec
Conservative Party of Canada senators
French Quebecers
Living people
21st-century Canadian politicians